William Matheus da Silva (born 2 April 1990), known as William Matheus, is a Brazilian footballer who plays for Figueirense Futebol Clube. Mainly a left back, he can also play as a centre back.

Career
William Matheus came through the youth ranks at Figueirense and graduated to the first team in 2008, playing Campeonato Brasileiro Série A games in that season.

William Matheus then had loan spells with Botafogo (DF), Tombense and Democrata-GV playing state league football. In June 2011, he signed a three-year contract with Boca Júnior (SE) and loaned to Bahia in the same month, and became a member of their U23 team. He played in 2011 Copa Governador do Estado da Bahia. He remained at Bahia for the first part of 2012, playing for the first team in Campeonato Baiano, but was released from his loan contract in June having suffered from injury and not been able to get back into the team. Later that month he signed on loan with Vasco da Gama until the end of 2012, to play in the 2012 Campeonato Brasileiro Série A. Having played 21 games, including 19 starts, for Vasco in Série A he obtained a contract for 2013 with Goiás. Despite interest from the board, he chose not to sign a new contract with Goiás, and left at the end of the season having played in 59 games and scored 3 goals in all competitions.

In January 2014, William Matheus signed with Palmeiras to play the 2014 season, the year of the centenary of the club. After just sixteen appearances, Palmeiras accepted an offer from French club Toulouse to sign him in July 2014.

William Matheus signed a four-year contract with Toulouse on 29 July 2014. He made his Ligue 1 debut on 9 August 2014 in a 3–2 defeat against Nice. After two seasons in France he returned to Brazil on a loan agreement with Fluminense. He left Toulouse permanently on 4 February 2017, signing a deal with Coritiba.

In 2019, despite being a regular for Coritiba, he was loaned to Guarani for the Campeonato Paulista.

References

External links
 

1990 births
Living people
Footballers from Rio de Janeiro (city)
Brazilian footballers
Association football fullbacks
Campeonato Brasileiro Série A players
Campeonato Brasileiro Série B players
Figueirense FC players
Tombense Futebol Clube players
Esporte Clube Bahia players
CR Vasco da Gama players
Goiás Esporte Clube players
Sociedade Esportiva Palmeiras players
Fluminense FC players
Coritiba Foot Ball Club players
Guarani FC players
Esporte Clube Juventude players
Ligue 1 players
Toulouse FC players
Shimizu S-Pulse players
Brazilian expatriate footballers
Brazilian expatriate sportspeople in France
Brazilian expatriate sportspeople in Japan
Expatriate footballers in France
Expatriate footballers in Japan